Quantum Experiments at Space Scale (QUESS), is a Chinese research project in the field of quantum physics.

Tiangong-2 is China's second Space Laboratory module which was launched on 15 September 2016. Tiangong-2 carries a total of 14 mission and experiment packages, including Space-Earth quantum key distribution and laser communications experiment to facilitate space-to-ground quantum communication.

A satellite, nicknamed Micius or Mozi after the ancient Chinese philosopher, is operated by the Chinese Academy of Sciences, as well as ground stations in China. The University of Vienna and the Austrian Academy of Sciences are running the satellite's European receiving stations.

QUESS is a proof-of-concept mission designed to facilitate quantum optics experiments over long distances to allow the development of quantum encryption and quantum teleportation technology. Quantum encryption uses the principle of entanglement to facilitate communication that can absolutely detect whether a third party has intercepted a message in transit thus denying undetected decryption. By producing pairs of entangled photons, QUESS will allow ground stations separated by many thousands of kilometres to establish secure quantum channels. QUESS itself has limited communication capabilities: it needs line-of-sight, and can only operate when not in sunlight.

Further Micius satellites were planned, including a global network by 2030.

The mission cost was around US$100 million in total.

Mission 

In addition, QUESS tested Bell's inequality at a distance of  – further than any experiment to date – and teleported a photon state between Shiquanhe Observatory in Ali, Tibet Autonomous Region, and the satellite. This requires very accurate orbital maneuvering and satellite tracking so the base stations can keep line-of-sight with the craft.

Launch 
The launch was initially scheduled for July 2016, but was rescheduled to August, with notification of the launch being sent just a few days in advance.
The spacecraft was launched by a Long March 2D rocket from Jiuquan Launch Pad 603, Launch Area 4 on 17 August 2016, at 17:40 UTC (01:40 local time).

Multi-payload mission 
The launch was a multi-payload mission shared with QUESS,  LiXing-1 research satellite, and ³Cat-2 Spanish science satellite.
  LiXing-1: LiXing-1 is a Chinese satellite designed to measure upper atmospheric density by lowering its orbit to 100–150 km. Its mass is 110 kg. On 19 August 2016, the satellite reentered into the atmosphere, so the mission is closed.
 ³Cat-2: The 3Cat-2 (spelled "cube-cat-two") is the second satellite in the 3Cat series and the second satellite developed in Catalonia at Polytechnic University of Catalonia’s NanoSat Lab. It is a 6-Unit CubeSat flying a novel GNSS Reflectometer (GNSS-R) payload for Earth observation. Its mass is 7.1 kg.

Secure key distribution 

The main instrument on board QUESS is a "Sagnac effect" interferometer. This is a device which generates pairs of entangled photons, allowing one of each to be transmitted to the ground. This will allow QUESS to perform Quantum key distribution (QKD) – the transmission of a secure cryptographic key that can be used to encrypt and decrypt messages – to two ground stations. QKD theoretically offers truly secure communication. In QKD, two parties who want to communicate share a random secret key transmitted using pairs of entangled photons sent with random polarization, with each party receiving one half of the pair. This secret key can then be used as a one-time pad, allowing the two parties to communicate securely through normal channels. Any attempt to eavesdrop on the key will disturb the entangled state in a detectable way. QKD has been attempted on Earth, both with direct line-of-sight between two observatories, and using fibre optic cables to transmit the photons. However, fibre optics and the atmosphere both cause scattering which destroys the entangled state, and this limits the distance over which QKD can be carried out. Sending the keys from an orbiting satellite results in less scattering, which allows QKD to be performed over much greater distances.

In addition, QUESS tests some of the basic foundations of quantum mechanics.

Analysis 
QUESS lead scientist Pan Jianwei told Reuters that the project has "enormous prospects" in the defence sphere. The satellite will provide secure communications between Beijing and Ürümqi, capital of Xinjiang, the remote western region of China. The US Department of Defense believes China is aiming to achieve the capability to counter the use of enemy space technology. Chinese Communist Party general secretary Xi Jinping has prioritised China's space program, which has included anti-satellite missile tests, and the New York Times noted that quantum technology was a focus of the thirteenth five-year plan, which the China government set out earlier that year. The Wall Street Journal said that the launch put China ahead of rivals, and brought them closer to "hack-proof communications". Several outlets identified Edward Snowden's leak of US surveillance documents as an impetus for the development of QUESS, with Popular Science calling it "a satellite for the post-Snowden age".

Similar projects 
QUESS is the first spacecraft launched capable of generating entangled photons in space, although transmission of single photons via satellites has previously been demonstrated by reflecting photons generated at ground-based stations off orbiting satellites. While not generating fully entangled photons, correlated pairs of photons have been produced in space using a cubesat by the National University of Singapore and the University of Strathclyde. A German consortium has performed quantum measurements of optical signals from the geostationary Alphasat Laser Communication Terminal. The US Defense Advanced Research Projects Agency (DARPA) launched the Quiness macroscopic quantum communications project to catalyze the development of an end-to-end global quantum internet in 2012.

In 2024, ESA intends to launch the Eagle-1 quantum key distribution satellite, with a goal similar to that of the Chinese QUESS. It will be part of the development and deployment of the European Quantum Communication Infrastructure (EuroQCI).

See also 

 Chinese space program
 Quantum information
 Quantum cryptography
 Quantum computing
 Quantum key distribution
 Quantum teleportation

References

External links 
 QUESS Launching (Chinese)
 3Cat-2 Satellite web site at Polytechnic University of Catalonia

Communications satellites
Satellites of China
Satellites of Austria
2016 in China
Quantum information science
Spacecraft launched in 2016
Communications satellites in low Earth orbit
2016 in Austria